The Awarua Wetland is a peatland area of  in the Southland Region of New Zealand.

Conservation Minister Steve Chadwick unveiled a plaque at New River Estuary on 4 May 2008. This wetland is unique in New Zealand as it includes privately owned ground (Gamble, Nicol, and Rance families).

While not a true wetland it is an area of natural vegetation with an unmodified stream flowing from the wetlands through native brush and into the Mataura river. It is a small sanctuary for the declining native fresh water fish population.

Intensive farming in the catchment for the wetland has raised fears that the Waituna Lagoon, which is a part of the wetland, may soon begin to suffer from eutrophication.

See also
Wetlands of New Zealand
Washdyke Lagoon

References

External links
Awarua Wetlands at the Department of Conservation
Waituna at Environment Southland

Ramsar sites in New Zealand
Wetlands of Southland, New Zealand